National Garden Clubs, Inc. is a nonprofit 501(c)(3) organization headquartered in St. Louis, Missouri. It consists of dozens of local branches, in nearly every state in the US and has about 165,000 members as of 2021. Its stated mission is “to promote the love of gardening, floral design, and civic and environmental responsibility." The first local branch met in Athens, Georgia, in 1891, and the National Garden Clubs organization was formed in 1929, by which point there were branches in 19 states. The NGC organizes community gardening projects, provides educational programs, and produces a quarterly publication, the National Gardener. It also offers college scholarships and grants for youth clubs planting pollinator gardens. They have published The Handbook for Flower Shows and Designing By Type. Mary Warshauer, of New Jersey, was installed as the president of the organization in 2021.

Partnerships 
The NGC works with Global Partners Running Water, a United Nations initiative, to increase access to safe drinking water in Latin America. They also partner with the National Wildlife Federation to create Community Wildlife Habitats. National Garden Clubs also works with the USDA Forest Service through the Penny Pine program to plant trees in areas where they have been destroyed.

References

Horticultural organizations based in the United States
501(c)(3) organizations
1929 establishments in the United States
Non-profit organizations based in St. Louis